The 1984 United Virginia Bank Classic, also known as the Richmond WCT, was a men's tennis tournament played on indoor carpet courts at the Richmond Coliseum in Richmond, Virginia in the United States. The event was part of 1984 World Championship Tennis circuit. It was the 19th and final edition of the tournament and was held from January 30 through February 5, 1984. First-seeded John McEnroe won the singles title and the $30,000 first-prize money.

Finals

Singles
 John McEnroe defeated  Steve Denton 6–3, 7–6(9–7)
 It was McEnroe's 2nd singles title of the year and the 48th of his career.

Doubles
 John McEnroe /  Patrick McEnroe defeated  Steve Denton /  Kevin Curren 7–6, 6–2

References

External links
 ITF tournament edition details

United Virginia Bank Classic
United Virginia Bank Classic
United Virginia Bank Classic
United Virginia Bank Classic
United Virginia Bank Classic